Montarville is a federal riding in Canada.

Montarville may also refer to:
 Montarville (provincial electoral district), a provincial riding in Quebec
 Terminus De Montarville, a public bus terminus

See also
 Saint-Bruno-de-Montarville, an off-island southshore suburb of Montreal, Quebec, Canada